The East Charlemont District School is a historic district school building at 1811 Massachusetts Route 2 in Charlemont, Massachusetts.  Built in 1828, it is one of a small number of surviving brick district schoolhouses in the state of Massachusetts.  The building was listed on the National Register of Historic Places in 2017.

Description and history
The East Charlemont District School stands in a rural setting in eastern Charlemont, on the north side of MA 2 west of its junction with East Oxbow Road and crossing of Oxbow Brook.  It is a single-story brick structure, with a gabled slate roof.  A wood-frame ell extends to one side.  The main facade is four bays wide, with the main entrance in the rightmost bay, topped by a four-light transom window.  The other bays are unevenly spaced sash windows set in rectangular openings.  There is a chimney at the left of the structure.

The school was built in 1828, at a time when there was a small village surrounding the property.  It was built largely by the efforts of East Charlemont villagers, its bricks manufactured at a nearby brickyard.  The school remained in active use as a school until 1944, by which time a significant number of the village buildings had been demolished, and it served only a small number of students.  Its interior has remained remarkably unchanged since its closure, in part due to a decision by the town to preserve the building, using it only for local meetings and educational tours for children.

See also
National Register of Historic Places listings in Franklin County, Massachusetts

References

School buildings on the National Register of Historic Places in Massachusetts
Charlemont, Massachusetts
National Register of Historic Places in Franklin County, Massachusetts